Steven Mays (born June 17, 1966) is an American wrestler. He competed in the men's Greco-Roman 54 kg at the 2000 Summer Olympics.

References

External links
 

1966 births
Living people
American male sport wrestlers
Olympic wrestlers of the United States
Wrestlers at the 2000 Summer Olympics
Sportspeople from Pensacola, Florida
Pan American Games medalists in wrestling
Pan American Games bronze medalists for the United States
Wrestlers at the 1999 Pan American Games
Medalists at the 1999 Pan American Games
20th-century American people
21st-century American people